The West Indian Reports, abbreviated WIR, are a series of law reports of cases decided in the high and appellate courts of West Indian states and territories, and of appeals therefrom to the Judicial Committee of the Privy Council and the Caribbean Court of Justice. The Reports include judgements from The Bahamas, Barbados, Belize, Bermuda, the Cayman Islands, the Eastern Caribbean States, Guyana, Jamaica, Trinidad and Tobago, and the Turks and Caicos Islands. They were first published in 1959 and, as of 2022, are currently published in two volumes each year, in both digital and hard copy formats.

History 
The Reports were first published in 1959 by Butterworths of London. Early volumes were published annually, edited by the chief justices of, and 'some other judges' in, Barbados, Guyana, Jamaica, Trinidad and Tobago, and the West Indies Associated States, and reported cases only from said jurisdictions. By 1988, the series were deemed essential stock for court libraries by a majority of 'legal officers, the judiciary and private practitioners of the Commonwealth Caribbean.' As late as September 2004, the series were still deemed 'the only [regional] report[s] published on a regular basis.' On 14 March 2007, the Caribbean Court of Justice directed that reference to the Reports 'should always' be given when cases cited in proceedings are reported in said series. By December 2018, the Reports had been digitised and disseminated online, thereby improving access to and discoverability of West Indian case law, resulting in a '[Commonwealth] Caribbean legal literature [which] has evolved rapidly in the last decade.'

Reception 
The Reports were initially criticised for an unusually restrictive, selective, and inconstruable editorial policy, and a prolonged time to publication, leading to 'inadequate' and 'defective' reporting. For instance, in April 1977, attendees of a workshop regarding legal education in the Caribbean noted 'the [continuing] need for an improved system of reporting [of] the decisions of the courts of the Commonwealth Caribbean.' Further, in a July 1985 address to the Caribbean Association of Law Libraries, Claude Denbow, a tutor at the Hugh Wooding Law School, noted that the Reports were still not sufficiently referenced in proceedings before West Indian courts, especially by barristers trained in England, leading to judgements discordant with 'local conditions.' Denbow attributed this state of affairs to, among other factors, the delayed publication of judgements in the Reports, and the confusing criteria employed by the Reports for the inclusion or exclusion of judgements.

Citation 
Citations to the Reports are one of two standard references for proceedings before the Caribbean Court of Justice. Cases reported in the Reports are cited as in the accompanying table. For instance, the first record of said table indicates that the decision of the Trinidad and Tobago Supreme Court, entitled Archbald v Camacho, was decided in 1960 and may be found in volume 3 of the West Indian Reports, starting on page 40.

Notes and references

Explanatory footnotes

Short citations

Full citations 

 
 
 
 
 
 
 
 
 
 
 
 

Publications established in 1959
Case law reporters